Julia B. Cameron (born March 4, 1948) is an American teacher, author, artist, poet, playwright, novelist, filmmaker, pigeon fancier, composer, and journalist. She is best known for her book The Artist's Way (1992). She also has written many other non-fiction works, short stories, and essays, as well as novels, plays, musicals, and screenplays.

Biography
Julia Cameron was born in  Libertyville, Illinois, a suburb of Chicago, and raised Catholic. She was the second oldest of seven children. She started college at Georgetown University before transferring to Fordham University. She wrote for The Washington Post and then Rolling Stone.

She met Martin Scorsese while on assignment for Oui Magazine. They married in 1976 and divorced a year later in 1977; Cameron was Scorsese's second wife. They have one daughter, Domenica Cameron-Scorsese, born in 1976. The marriage ended after Scorsese began seeing Liza Minnelli while the three of them were working on New York, New York. Cameron and Scorsese collaborated on three films. Her memoir Floor Sample details her descent into alcoholism and drug addiction, which induced blackouts, paranoia and psychosis. In 1978, reaching a point in her life when writing and drinking could no longer coexist, Cameron stopped abusing drugs and alcohol, and began teaching creative unblocking, eventually publishing the book based on her work: The Artist's Way. At first she sold Xeroxed copies of the book in a local bookstore before it was published by TarcherPerigee in 1992. She contends that creativity is an authentic spiritual path.

Cameron has taught filmmaking, creative unblocking, and writing. She has taught at The Smithsonian, Esalen, the Omega Institute for Holistic Studies, and the New York Open Center. At Northwestern University, she was writer in residence for film. In 2008 she taught a class at the New York Open Center, The Right to Write, named and modeled after one of her bestselling books, which reveals the importance of writing. She continues to teach regularly around the world.

Cameron has lived in Los Angeles, Chicago, New York City, and Washington D.C., but now lives in Santa Fe, New Mexico

Bibliography

Nonfiction 
 Write for Life: A Toolkit for Writers (Profile Books, 2023) 
 Seeking Wisdom: A Spiritual Path to Creative Connection (A Six-Week Artist's Way Program) (St. Martin's Press, 2021)
 The Listening Path: The Creative Art of Attention (St. Martin's Press, 2021)
 It's Never Too Late to Begin Again: Discovering Creativity and Meaning at Midlife and Beyond (Tarcher, 2016)
 The Artist's Way for Parents: Raising Creative Children  (Tarcher/Hay House, 2013)
 The Prosperous Heart: Creating a Life of "Enough"  (Tarcher/Hay House, 2011)
 Faith and Will: Weathering the Storms in Our Spiritual Lives (Tarcher, 2010)
 The Creative Life: True Tales of Inspiration (Tarcher, 2010)
 The Artist's Way Every Day: A Year of Creative Living (Tarcher, 2009)
 Prayers to the Great Creator: Prayers and Declarations for a Meaningful Life (Tarcher, 2008)
 The Writing Diet: Write Yourself Right-Size (Tarcher, 2007)
 Finding Water: The Art of Perseverance (Tarcher, 2006)
 Floor Sample (Tarcher, 2006), a memoir
 How to Avoid Making Art (2006), illustrated by Elizabeth Cameron
 Letters to a Young Artist (Tarcher, 2005)
 The Sound of Paper (Tarcher, 2004; Hardcover )
 Supplies: A Troubleshooting Guide for Creative Difficulties (Tarcher, 2003; Revised & Updated edition )
 Walking in this World (Tarcher, 2003; Reprint edition )
 The Artist's Way, 10th Annv edition (Tarcher, 2002)
 Inspirations: Meditations from The Artist's Way (Tarcher, 2001;)
 God is Dog Spelled Backwards (Tarcher, 2000)
 God is No Laughing Matter (Tarcher, 2000)
 Supplies: A Pilot's Manual for Creative Flight (2000)
 The Artist's Date Book (Tarcher, 1999), illustrated by Elizabeth Cameron Evans
 Money Drunk Money Sober (Ballantine Wellspring, 1999)
 The Writing Life (Sounds True, 1999)
 Transitions (Tarcher, 1999)
 The Artist's Way at Work (Pan, 1998)
 Blessings (Tarcher, 1998)
 The Right to Write: An Invitation and Initiation into the Writing Life (Tarcher, 1998)
 Heart Steps (Tarcher, 1997)
 The Vein of Gold (1997)
 The Artist's Way Morning Pages Journal (Tarcher, 1995)
 The Money Drunk (1993)
 The Artist's Way (1992)

Fiction
 Popcorn: Hollywood Stories (Really Great Books, 2000)
 The Dark Room (Carroll & Graf Pub,1998)

Musicals
 Avalon
 Magellan
 The Medium at Large

Plays
 Four Roses
 Public Lives
 The Animal in the Trees

Poetry collections
 This Earth (Sounds True, 1997)
 Prayers for the little ones (Renaissance Books, 1999)
 Prayers to the nature spirits (Renaissance Books, 1999)
 The Quiet Animal

Film/TV
 Miami Vice TV (1 episode)
 God's Will (independent movie)

References

External links

Julia Cameron Live, official website for Julia Cameron and her online creativity workshops
Julia Cameron video interview Julia Cameron interviewed by her publisher at Tarcher Books

1948 births
Living people
20th-century American dramatists and playwrights
20th-century American novelists
20th-century American poets
20th-century American women writers
American film directors
American motivational writers
Women motivational writers
American self-help writers
American spiritual writers
American television writers
American women dramatists and playwrights
American women film directors
American women novelists
American women poets
American women screenwriters
Nautilus Book Award winners
American women television writers
Novelists from Illinois
Writers from New Mexico
American women non-fiction writers
20th-century American non-fiction writers
Screenwriters from Illinois
Screenwriters from New Mexico
21st-century American women